Fox Faith (also spelled FoxFaith) was a brand of film studio 20th Century Fox targeting evangelical Christians.

Established under 20th Century Fox Home Entertainment in 2006, Fox Faith acquired independent Christian-themed films for theatrical and video release. 20th Century Fox described Fox Faith titles as "morally-driven, family-friendly programming," and requires them to "have overt Christian [c]ontent or be derived from the work of a Christian author."

The label's theatrical releases were by arrangement with the AMC Theatres and Carmike Cinemas chains, and most of their films were digital releases.

All of the Fox Faith film library are now owned by The Walt Disney Company, following Disney's acquisition of 21st Century Fox on March 20, 2019.

Films
 Thr3e (2006) (USA) (theatrical)
 Love's Abiding Joy (2006) ... Distributor (2006) (USA) (television)
 One Night with the King (2006) ... Distributor (2006) (USA) (theatrical)
 The Last Sin Eater (February 9, 2007) ... Distributor (2007) (USA) (theatrical)
 The Ultimate Gift (March 9, 2007) (USA) (theatrical)
 The Final Inquiry (2006) (a.k.a. The Inquiry / L'Inchiesta) ... Distributor (2007) (USA) (theatrical)
 Moondance Alexander (2007) ... Distributor (2007) (USA) (theatrical)
 Saving Sarah Cain (2007) ... Distributor (2007) (USA) (television)
 A Good Man Is Hard to Find (2008) (V) ... Distributor (2008) (USA) (all media)
 Ace of Hearts (2008) ... Distributor (2008) (USA) (Theatrical)
 Mama, I Want to Sing! (2009) ... Distributor (2009) (USA) (all media)

See also
 Pinnacle Peak Pictures
 Kingdom Studios
 Affirm Films
 Provident Films
 Kendrick Brothers
 Sherwood Pictures
 Lightworkers Media

References

Christian mass media companies
20th Century Studios
Defunct American film studios
Defunct companies based in Greater Los Angeles
Disney acquisitions
Christian film production companies
Walt Disney Studios (division)
The Walt Disney Company subsidiaries